Local elections were held in Scotland on 7 May 1992, to elect members to all 53 district councils. It was the last local election held under the Local Government (Scotland) Act 1973, which had established the two-tier system of regions and districts. Regional and district councils were abolished in 1996, and replaced with 29 new mainland unitary authorities under the terms of the Local Government etc. (Scotland) Act 1994.

Overview

Background
There was some speculation that these elections would be the last under the present two-tier system, as a review of council areas had been announced by the incumbent Conservative Government (The last elections were in fact the 1994 regional elections). The elections were seen as a test of the Conservative Government elected a month before in April, where the Conservatives had increased their vote share, much to the surprise of pollsters.

Outcome
The election saw a decrease in turnout of more than 5%, the lowest since District Council elections were introduced in 1974. The number of women candidates increased to 26.7%, although only 21.5% of elected councillors were women, showing that the main parties often preferred to nominate men in wards where they had a better chance of winning. Labour saw a sharp fall on their vote share, down 8.5% from 1988. The main beneficiaries of this decline were the Conservatives, up 3.8%, but still in third place behind the SNP, who gained 3.0%. The Liberal Democrats also made modest gains, taking a new record of 95 seats.

Regional Trends

Labour held most of their strongholds in the central belt, as well as Dundee and Aberdeen; even though their vote share decreased more in these areas (Such as East Lothian, down 13% from 1988 and Glasgow, down 11.8%) than elsewhere. The Conservatives were most successful in places were they hadn't stood many (if any) candidates before, such as Clackmannan (where the party only stood two candidates in 1988). Independents remained the largest party in rural areas, while the Liberal Democrats held their two councils of North East Fife and Annandale and Eskdale.

National results

|-
!colspan=3|Votes Total
!Votes %
!Seats
|-
| 
|504,076
|34.0
|468
|-
| 
|360,014
|24.3
|150
|-
| 
|343,358
|23.2
|204
|-
| 
|140,697
|9.5
|94
|-
| 
|107,586
|7.4
|228
|-
| style="width: 10px" bgcolor=|
| style="text-align: left;" scope="row" | Other
|26,057
|1.9
|14
|-
!colspan=2|Total
! 1,481,788
!n/a 
!1158
|}

Results by council area

Borders

Central

Dumfries and Galloway

Fife

Grampian

Highland

Lothian

Strathclyde

Tayside

References

 
1992
May 1992 events in the United Kingdom